Interstate 280  may refer to multiple highways, all of which are or were related to Interstate 80:

 Interstate 280 (California), a north–south freeway running from San Jose to San Francisco
 Interstate 280 (Iowa–Illinois), part of the beltway around the Quad Cities
 Interstate 280 (New Jersey), a connector from Interstate 80 to Interstate 95 in Newark
 Interstate 280 (Ohio), a connector in Toledo from Interstates 80/90 to Interstate 75
 Interstate 276, once designated as I-280 when I-76 was I-80S
 Interstate 680 (Nebraska–Iowa), once designated as I-280

80-2
2